Dušan Pavlov (born 19 July 1989) is a Serbian football player who currently plays for Várda SE.

Born in Kikinda (SFR Yugoslavia), he started playing in a local club FK Kikinda 
In 2011 he signed to Egri FC. He made his Nemzeti Bajnokság II debut on 15 October 2011 against Kazincbarcikai SC

Career
He made his Nemzeti Bajnokság I debut on 3 August 2012 in a 1–1 drawn to BFC Siófok

References 

1989 births
Living people
Sportspeople from Kikinda
Serbian footballers
Association football forwards
OFK Kikinda players
FK TSC Bačka Topola players
Egri FC players
Putnok VSE footballers
Kisvárda FC players
Nemzeti Bajnokság I players
Serbian expatriate footballers
Expatriate footballers in Hungary
Serbian expatriate sportspeople in Hungary